Kicking & Screaming is the overall fourth release by heavy metal singer Sebastian Bach, but is the second to include all original studio recordings. The album was released on September 21, 2011, in Japan, September 23, 2011, in Europe and Australia and September 27, 2011, in North America.
The original album cover art was made by Richard Villa.

Release and promotion
The album titled track "Kicking & Screaming" was released as the lead single in the US, UK and Australia. The music video premiered on the Revolver website on August 3, 2011. The track "My Own Worst Enemy" was also released as a single in Japan. Further videos were made for the promo single "I'm Alive" and "Tunnelvision".

The album debuted on the Billboard Top 200 album chart at No. 73.

The 2008 single "Battle with the Bottle", which Bach sang on the finale of the reality TV show "Gone Country season 2", is included as a bonus track on the album. The music video is also included on the deluxe DVD edition.

Reception
The album was received positively. Dave Steed of Popdose.com said, "Kicking & Screaming is unexpectedly fantastic and the Sebastian Bach record that I've been wishing for, for more than a decade now."

Track listing

DVD (deluxe edition only)
As Long as I Got the Music: The Making of Kicking and Screaming is a bonus DVD included on the deluxe edition of the album. It features behind-the-scenes footage of the recording of the album, live footage from Bach's tours opening for Guns N' Roses, and three music videos from "Kicking & Screaming" including the title track, "Tunnelvision", and "I'm Alive". Also included is the music video for the single "Battle with the Bottle" and video shoots between tracks.

Personnel

Band
 Sebastian Bach – vocals
 Bobby Jarzombek – drums, percussion
 Nick Sterling – bass, guitar

Guest musicians
 John 5 – guitar (track 3)

Other personnel
 Tom Baker – mastering
 Kyle Hoffmann – assistant engineer
 Richard Mace – layout design
 Bob Marlette – engineer, mixing, producer
 Chris Marlette – digital editing
 Clay Patrick McBride – photography
 Jon Gordon McKenzie – cover photo
 Richard Villa III – cover art, logo

Chart positions

References

External links
 

Sebastian Bach albums
2011 albums
Albums produced by Bob Marlette
Frontiers Records albums